Halma may refer to:
 Halma, a board game invented by George Howard Monks, an American thoracic surgeon at Harvard Medical School
 Nicholas Halma (1755-1828), mathematician and translator
 Halma (actor), film actor of the 1910s and '20s, e.g. Le Miracle des loups (1924 film)
 Halma (horse), an American Thoroughbred racehorse
 Halma, Minnesota, a city in the United States
 Halma plc, a group of technology companies that makes products for hazard detection and life protection
 Halma, an 1895 novel by Benito Pérez Galdós, basis of the film Viridiana
 Halma, fictional planet in the science fiction novel Emphyrio by Jack Vance
 Halma, Wallonia, a district of the municipality of Wellin, Belgium